Kollangudi Karuppayee is a Tamil folk singer who has also performed in films. She is considered one of the pioneers of Tamil folk music; as the first of her genre and background to perform in films, she served as an inspiration for many other folk artistes. She started her career as a performer on All India Radio about thirty years before her foray into films. She is a recipient of the prestigious Kalaimamani award for her contributions to music.

Filmography

In Movies

As Singer

Her husband died in front of her eyes on their way to Madurai for a song recording, this tragedic incident made her bedridden and shut cine offers, later her daughter also died in a road accident which made her a more weak mentally.
Now this legend is being taken care by the youths of her society.

References

External links
 Biographical piece from the Hindu

Year of birth missing (living people)
Living people
Indian women playback singers
Indian women radio people
Singers from Tamil Nadu
Tamil singers
Tamil folk singers
Women musicians from Tamil Nadu
20th-century Indian women singers
20th-century Indian singers
Indian women folk singers
Indian folk singers